On July 13, 2004, a powerful F4 tornado formed outside of Roanoke, a small town in central Illinois. It is best known for the numerous videos and pictures taken of it as well as the complete destruction of the Parsons Manufacturing plant. Despite the damage, there were only three minor injuries and no fatalities. It was one of six tornadoes to touch down on July 13, 2004.

Description
On Tuesday, July 13, 2004, at about 2:30 p.m., a tornado with a maximum reported width of a  struck west of the village of Roanoke, damaging much of the area and cutting power to the main town of Roanoke for three days. Based on the extreme damage, the tornado was classified as a violent F4 on the Fujita scale by the National Weather Service.

Damage

The worst damage occurred at the Parsons Company manufacturing plant, a parts supplier for Caterpillar Inc., which was leveled, losing its roof and outer walls. Although about 140 people were inside the building when the tornado struck, there were no fatalities and only a few minor injuries. This was attributed to preparations made during the construction of the plant and spotter training given to some of the workers. Although no tornado sirens were heard at the plant before the tornado struck, an alarm sounded by one of the spotters allowed all the workers to move to storm shelters and ride out the storm.

Three neighboring farmsteads were completely swept away, with only debris remaining in the basements. Trees were debarked, and farm machinery was thrown and mangled.

Aftermath & impact
The storm was an example of how structural planning, storm spotting, and awareness techniques can be used by companies. The plant owner's decision to include storm shelters in the building's design likely saved the lives of many employees. Just as important, the early notice provided by the company storm-spotters allowed employees to reach the shelters before the storm struck. The Parsons plant reopened in April 2005 with seven tornado shelters, five more than the original plant.

Two local residents chased the tornado for much of its 23-minute duration. They produced a half-hour-long video that was sold in the Peoria area to help raise funds for employees of the Parsons plant, most of whom had lost their cars and were either underinsured or not insured.

The Roanoke tornado was the most significant tornado of a small tornado outbreak which transitioned into a destructive derecho over an extensive area of the Ohio and Tennessee Valleys extending to the Gulf of Mexico. The outbreak produced three other tornadoes, all rated F0. The Roanoke 2004 Tornado was featured on The Weather Channel's Storm Stories and Full Force Nature.

The Parsons plant would come very close to being destroyed again during the Washington, IL Tornado on November 17, 2013, however, that tornado passed just northwest of the plant.

See also 
 List of North American tornadoes and tornado outbreaks
 List of derecho events

References

External links 
 Roanoke F4 Tornado of July 13, 2004 (NWS Central Illinois)
 Supercell of July 13, 2004 (NWS Chicago)
 Preliminary Review of WSR-88D Radar Signatures seen in the F0 & F1 Central IL Tornadoes during the Record Setting 2003 Tornado Season (James Auten & Ernest Goetsch ~ NWS Central Illinois)
The July 13, 2004 Tornado Event: Analysis of Tornadogenesis in a Highly Unstable Environment  (Ed Shimon, Pat Bak & Kirk Huettl ~ NWS Central Illinois)
 The July 13, 2004 Tornado Event: The Contributions of Evolving Paradigms & Human Factors in the Warning Process (Lyle Barker ~ NWS Central Illinois)
 The July 13, 2004 Roanoke Illinois Tornado Event: The Warning Response Process at the Parsons Plant (Chris Miller ~ NWS Central Illinois)
 {https://web.archive.org/web/20110604123921/http://video.google.com/videoplay?docid=3669229307285179970&ei=_ZFvScGaEo3I-gGSnPm0BQ&q=roanoke,+il+tornado] Actual footage

F4 tornadoes by date
Roanoke, Illinois,2004-07-13
Tornadoes of 2004
Tornadoes in Illinois
Woodford County, Illinois
Derechos in the United States
Roanoke Tornado, 2004
2004 in Illinois
Roanoke tornado 2004-07-13